Anything to Survive, also called Almost Too Late, is a 1990 Canadian-American coproduced disaster survival film  directed by Zale Dalen and starring Robert Conrad, Matt LeBlanc and Emily Perkins. It is loosely based on the true story of the Wortman family of Prince of Wales Island, Alaska.

Plot

The Barton family; siblings Wendy, Krista and Billy and their father Eddie become stranded on a beach while sailing from Prince Rupert to their home in Ketchikan, Alaska. The plot concerns the family going to extreme lengths to survive after they get stranded on an island in a storm and lose their boat. Billy builds a raft and they attempt to sail to safety but they don't get far. Eddie and Billie head off to seek help while the two daughters try to keep warm under the remains of their boat's sail.  Eddie and Billy find their way to a cabin on the mainland but can't raise help. On day 23 they are able to return to the island and find that the girls are alive. Eddie and Wendy have frostbitten feet but all in the family survive and they are able to return to Ketchikan.

Cast

Robert Conrad, Eddie
Emily Perkins, Krista
Matt LeBlanc, Billy
Ocean Hellman, Wendy
Tom Heaton, Dave 
William B. Davis, Dr. Reynolds

Reception and nominations

Anything to Survive is a made-for-television film, although the film did have some half-price screenings at limited cinemas in the United Kingdom, including one at London IMAX. The film was nominated for a Gemini Award in 1990 for Best Performance by a Supporting Actress (Ocean Hellman).

External links
 

1990 films
1990s disaster films
1990s English-language films
1990 drama films
American disaster films
American survival films
American television films
Canadian disaster films
English-language Canadian films
Canadian survival films
Canadian television films
Disaster films based on actual events
Disaster television films
Films about families
Films about survivors of seafaring accidents or incidents
Films set in Alaska
Films set in British Columbia
1990s American films
1990s Canadian films